The Bruce School may refer to:
 The Blanche Kelso Bruce Elementary School (now the Bruce-Monroe Elementary School at Park View) in Washington, D.C.
 Bruce School (Argyle, Manitoba)